Jiang (also romanized Chiang, Kong, Kang) is a Chinese surname, accounting for 0.26% of the Han Chinese population. It is the 52nd most common Chinese surname and is the 141st surname listed in the Hundred Family Surnames poem, contained in the line 江童顏郭 (Jiāng, Tóng, Yán, Guō). It is the 74th most common surname in China (2007), and the 25th most common surname in Taiwan (2010).

Origins
After Boyi helped Yu the Great bring flood control to near yellow river, Yu's son and successor Qi of Xia offered Boyi's son, Xuanzhong, the position of Lord of Jiangdi ( - modern Jiangling County in Hubei Province). Boyi's descendants ruled the area as kings of an autonomous "River Kingdom" during the Shang Dynasty and Western Zhou Dynasty, with its capital city near today's Zhengyang County, Henan Province.

During the Spring and Autumn period, the kingdom was often under attack from the neighboring states of Chu, Song, and Qi, each of which was larger than the "River Kingdom". While defending from neighbors' attacks, the Jiang state also had to deal with the Huai River's frequent flooding, which often inundated the kingdom's central areas. These difficulties prevented Jiang from developing significant economic or military power. It survived until 623 BC when it was destroyed by Chu.

At the time of the kingdom's destruction, many of its surviving inhabitants fled to what is now Henan Province and took the kingdom's name, "Jiang", as their clan name (shi).

Notable people named 江

 Jiang Qing (江青; 1914–1991), also known as Madame Mao, Chinese communist revolutionary, actress, and major political figure 
 Johnny Chiang (江啓臣), Taiwanese politician, leader of Kuomintang 
 Jiang Zemin (江泽民), former General Secretary of the Chinese Communist Party
 March Kong Fong Eu (江月桂), first Asian American woman elected to state constitutional office in US
 John Chiang, Californian politician
 Jiang Kanghu, Chinese politician and activist
 Jiang Hongjie, Chinese politician and activist
 Jody Chiang (江蕙), Taiwanese pop singer
 Jiang Yu Chen (江語晨), Taiwanese pop singer
 Maggie Chiang (江美琪), Taiwanese pop singer
 Jiang Zhujiu, Chinese Go player
 Jiang Dihua, mathematician
 Jiang Heping, CCTV executive
 Jiang Hong, Chinese footballer
 Jiang Wen-Ye, Taiwanese composer
 Mingjiu Jiang, Chinese professional Go player
 Jiang Chaozong, Chinese general and Premier of the Republic of China
 Jiang Yan, Southern Dynasty poet
 Empress Jiang, Liu Song dynasty empress
 Jiang Qian, Chinese intellectual
 Chiang Pin-kung, Chairperson of Straits Exchange Foundation (2008–2012)
 Jiang Yuyuan, Chinese gymnast
 Chiang Sheng, Taiwanese martial arts actor
 Jiang Zhujiu, Chinese Go player
 Leslie Kong, Chinese Jamaican record producer
 Wah Kau Kong (1919–1944), Chinese-American fighter pilot
 Kong Duen-Yee (江端仪, 1923–1966), Hong Kong actor
 Cecilia Chiang (Chiang Sun Yun)  (江孫芸; 1920–2020), a Chinese-American restaurateur and chef, best known for founding and managing the Mandarin Restaurant in San Francisco, California.
 Philip Chiang, son of Cecilia Chiang, co-founder of P. F. Chang's China Bistro
Chopin Kiang, Nevada Dept. of Education First Cultural Diversity And First Asian American State Administrator.

References

Chinese-language surnames
Individual Chinese surnames